The 2011 Newfoundland and Labrador Scotties Tournament of Hearts was held January 19–23, 2011 at the Bally Haly Golf and Curling Club in St. John's, Newfoundland and Labrador, Canada. The winning team of Stacie Devereaux represented Newfoundland and Labrador at the 2011 Scotties Tournament of Hearts in Charlottetown, Prince Edward Island, where they finished the round robin with a record of 1-10.

Teams

Standings

Results
All Times Are Local (NT)

Draw 1
January 19, 7:00 PM

Draw 2
January 20, 9:00 AM

Draw 3
January 20, 7:00 PM

Draw 4
January 21, 1:00 PM

Draw 5
January 21, 7:00PM

Playoffs

Semifinal
January 22, 12:00 PM

Final 1
January 23, 9:00 AM

Final 2
January 23, 2:00 PM

**Devereaux must be beaten twice

References

Newfoundland And Labrador Scotties Tournament Of Hearts, 2011
Newfoundland and Labrador
Sport in St. John's, Newfoundland and Labrador
Curling in Newfoundland and Labrador
 Scotties Tournament of Hearts
Newfoundland and Labrador Scotties Tournament of Hearts